Loránd Milassin (18 January 1948 – 1 April 2021) was a Hungarian hurdler. He competed in the men's 110 metres hurdles at the 1972 Summer Olympics.

References

External links

1948 births
2021 deaths
Athletes (track and field) at the 1972 Summer Olympics
Hungarian male hurdlers
Olympic athletes of Hungary
Athletes from Budapest